The Accidental Spy is a 2001 Hong Kong martial arts action film starring Jackie Chan, produced by Chan and Raymond Chow, and directed by Teddy Chan. Filming took place in Seoul, Hong Kong, Istanbul and Cappadocia, Turkey.

Although it is a Hong Kong film, much of the dialogue is in English, particularly during communications between the Hong Kong characters and the Korean and Turkish characters. Despite being an adventure-thriller, it features moments of humour, as is typical of Chan's films.

The film was nominated for the Best Action Choreography, Best Editing, Best Visual Effects and Best Sound Design in the 21st Hong Kong Film Awards, and won in former two categories. It was also nominated the Best Action Choreography in the 38th Golden Horse Awards.

Plot
A news reporting team cover a story in an Anatolian village where many people have seemingly died from pneumonia while a team of scientists try to find a cure. A terrorist group disguised as farmers attack and kill everyone there. Some days later, a former North Korean spy shows up at the South Korean embassy in Istanbul.

Meanwhile, in Hong Kong, Buck Yuen, an exercise equipment salesman, inadvertently foils a bank robbery and becomes a media celebrity. Later that night, a stranger called Manny Liu approaches Yuen and says that he is looking for men of Yuen's age and description on behalf of a terminally ill Korean man, Park Won-jung, who wants to pass his fortune to his long-lost son.

Yuen agrees and follows Liu's associate to South Korea to meet Park in a military hospital. Later, Yuen is approached by Carmen, a reporter, who asks him questions about Park. When Yuen returns to the hospital, he saves Park from a group of thugs and accepts Park's offer to play a "game" – if Yuen wins, he gets everything Park leaves behind for his biological son; if Yuen loses, he will still have fun. Park also gives Yuen a shiny crucifix similar to the one Yuen sees his parents holding in his dreams. After Park's death, Yuen scatters his ashes at his wife's grave and finds a message ("wait for me") engraved on the tombstone. After leaving the cemetery, Yuen and Carmen narrowly evade attacks from thugs. Yuen later realises that "wait for me" corresponds to a phone number of a bank in Istanbul.

In Istanbul, Yuen uses the crucifix, which turns out to be a stamp, to retrieve the contents of Park's safety deposit box. Shortly after leaving the bank, he encounters several robbers trying to steal his briefcase full of money. He holds off the robbers until the police show up and the robbers flee. While touring Istanbul, Yuen meets a mysterious Chinese woman, Yong, who has "wait for me" embroidered on her scarf. When Yuen asks her where she got her scarf, she arranges to meet him at a later date and time.

When Yuen is at a Turkish bath, he gets accosted by a group of thugs demanding that he hands over "the thing". After a long chase through the streets, Yuen finally escapes from them but shows up late for his meeting with Yong. Just then, Carmen and her colleague, Philip, approach Yuen and reveal to him that they are actually CIA agents. The "thing" that everyone is after is a biological weapon, Anthrax II, a more powerful version of anthrax. The weapon had already killed many people in Anatolia, which was chosen as a testing ground. Park developed brain cancer as a result of his involvement in the case. Yuen also learns that Zen, a crime lord, wants to buy the Anthrax II and had sent Yong to get close to Yuen to gather information.

Yuen meets up with Yong, who confirms she is working for Zen. Moments later, they are captured by a group of thugs and brought back to the Anatolian village. As the thugs are beating up Yuen to force him to tell them where the Anthrax II is, mercenaries attack the village and gun down all the thugs. In the ensuing chaos, Yuen escapes with Yong on a makeshift raft. They are picked up by Zen, who reveals that he sent the mercenaries to save them. Yuen also learns that Yong is a drug addict enslaved by Zen. Zen offers Yuen a new deal: more money and Yong's freedom in exchange for the Anthrax II. Although Yuen refuses, Zen still gives him time to find the Anthrax II.

Yuen recalls that there was a Bible in the safety deposit box so he makes his way to a nearby church and meets a priest who knows Park. The priest leads Yuen to the basement where Park temporarily stayed; Yuen finds two vials of Anthrax II there and a note saying "game over". Yuen then reluctantly hands over the Anthrax II to Zen in exchange for Yong. It turns out later that Zen had double-crossed Yuen by giving Yong a fatal dose of drugs. After Yong dies at the train station, Yuen gets arrested and thrown into prison but Carmen and Ashley bail him out. Carmen, feeling sorry for Yong's death, secretly reveals to Yuen that the CIA is meeting Zen the next day to discuss buying the Anthrax II from him.

Yuen takes matters into his own hands and tries to stop Zen at the airport. While Zen and his henchmen flee in a car, Yuen chases them, fights them and manages to get back the Anthrax II. However, the car gets stuck to the rear of a tanker, which soon catches fire. The tanker has to keep moving at a certain speed or else it will explode. After Yuen manages to save the driver and his son, the tanker is heading straight towards the edge of a disused bridge. Just then, Manny Liu appears in a helicopter and tries to pull Yuen out but fails. Yuen leaps from the tanker and grabs hold of the plastic bridge barrier as he swings down. He rolls down a slope, sustains severe injuries from the fall, and becomes unconscious. Liu searches Yuen for the Anthrax II, finds it and leaves.

When Yuen regains consciousness in hospital later, he learns from Liu that his entire adventure was actually a CIA mission arranged to be performed by him as an informal, non-official agent (an "accidental spy"). He was chosen because of his background as an orphan, his sharp intuition and excellent fighting skills. The dream of his parents is actually an illusion created by Liu, who added drugs into Yuen's drink to put him into a hypnotic state.

In a post-credits scene, Yuen, now officially a spy, delivers a briefcase to a drug dealer in Italy and tips off the police to arrest him.

Cast
Jackie Chan as Buck Yuen
Eric Tsang as Manny Liu
Vivian Hsu as Yong
Wu Hsing-kuo as Lee Sang-Zen
Kim Min as Carmen
Alfred Cheung as Park's lawyer
Lillian Ho as Candice
Cheung Tat-ming as Stan
Joh Young-kwon as Park Won-jung
Anthony Rene Jones as Philip Ashley

Soundtrack
Track listing

Production and release
With HK$200 Million budget invested, the film grossed merely HK$30 million during its theatrical run in Hong Kong, despite it was Hong Kong's third biggest domestic release of the year.
Accidental Spy is the last film Jackie Chan film produced under Golden Harvest, after some 22 films the production company had produced with Chan.

Dimension Films version
Dimension Films (then a sub-set of Miramax, which was owned by The Walt Disney Company) acquired the international distribution rights to the film outside of Asia. Like many Jackie Chan films distributed by Disney, scenes were cut, foreign dialogue was dubbed, and the music score was changed.
Buck Yuen's name was changed to Jackie Chan
Zen's name was changed to Lee
The Anthrax II was changed to "Opio Maxa", a new and more powerful form of opium. The context of the conflict between Zen and the Turkish villagers was changed to be a drug war between Korean and Turkish drug lords.
In some cases, scenes were actually re-arranged. For example, in the original Hong Kong cut, Buck Yuen and Manny's associate arrive at the South Korean hospital, they talk to the doctor, then Buck visits with Carmen Wong, and then Buck goes back to the hospital, fends off the thugs attacking his "father", and then converses with him. However, in the Dimension version, they arrive at the hospital, then "Jackie" talks to his father, then he visits Carmen Wong, and then he returns to the hospital, fends off the thugs, but Dimension added in a "flatline" sound effect, and used a scene of Mr. Park struggling to breathe to suggest that he died because of the thugs.
A lot of dialogue that was actually in English was dubbed over into foreign languages, creating a language barrier between "Jackie Chan" and other characters that didn't exist in the original Hong Kong version. A lot of English dialogue was dubbed over to change the plot.
Buck's dialogue is sometimes dubbed over by a voice that definitely doesn't belong to Jackie Chan, including scenes in which he was speaking in English.

It holds a 29% "rotten" rating on Rotten Tomatoes based on 7 reviews.

Home media

DVD
The film was first released on DVD by Universe Laser in Hong Kong. The release contains a non-anamorphic picture and a "making of" feature section. On 19 March 2009, Kam & Ronson released a remastered DVD with an anamorphic picture, 5.1 and DTS sound, but with no special features.

Blu-ray
The film was released on Blu-ray Disc on 4 May 2009. This film is the first Hong Kong production by Jackie Chan to be released on Blu-ray Disc.

Legacy
The scene of Buck's disguising while escaping from thugs was reproduced in Bollywood movie Thank You (2011), wherein Akshay Kumar's character, detective Kishan, also hides by twisting hanging materials around himself.

Awards and nominations
21st Hong Kong Film Awards (2002)
Won: Best Action Choreography (Tung Wei)
Won: Best Film Editing (Kwong Chi-leung)
Nomination: Best Sound Design (Kinson Tsang)
Nomination: Best Visual Effects

See also
Jackie Chan filmography
List of Hong Kong films

References

External links

HKMDB
Review from HKCuk.co.uk

2001 films
2001 action films
2001 martial arts films
2000s Cantonese-language films
Films about bank robbery
Films about the Central Intelligence Agency
Films directed by Teddy Chan
Films scored by Michael Wandmacher
Films set in Istanbul
Films set in Seoul
Films shot in Istanbul
Films shot in Seoul
Golden Harvest films
Hong Kong martial arts films
2000s Hong Kong films